This list of women singers from Lebanon includes female singers who have at least one parent from Lebanon.

List

Present

Past

References

Singers, female
Singers
Lebanese singers